The Baby-Brousse is a Citroën 2CV-based utility vehicle, initially privately built, that later spawned the FAF series of vehicles.

Similar to a metal-bodied Citroën Méhari, the Baby-Brousse was a success with more than 31,000 being built from 1963 to 1987. The entire body was made of folded sheet metal with the other parts being bolted together  without welding.

Background
The Baby-Brousse was originally conceived in 1963 by two Frenchmen, Messrs. Letoquin and Lechanteurin, owners of Les Ateliers et Forges de l’Ebrié, a company in Abidjan, the capital of the Ivory Coast.

Sales figures

Baby Brousse-type vehicles have been made and sold under different names in several places:
Baby Brousse in Ivory Coast (1963–1979), 1,320 built.
SAIPAC Jyane-Mehari in Iran (1970–1979), 9,315 vehicles.
Citroën Yagán in Chile (1973–1976), 651 examples  (or 1,500 examples).
Indonesia Baby Brousse 480 & FAF 600 
Central African Republic Baby Brousse 180 & FAF 60 
Namco Pony in Thessalonika, Greece (1974–83), built with Dyane 6 components in a specifically built factory. These had better build quality and equipment than others. 30,000 examples were built (16,680 according to Marie & Étienne Christian). The Pony was the only Baby Brousse exported to the United States. 
Mehari in Senegal & Guinea Bissau (1979–1983), ± 500 vehicles.
Vietnam Citroën La Dalat (1969–1975)  was manufactured, with 3,850 examples produced. Its creator, Jacques Duchemin, proposed the FAF concept to Citroën when he came back to France after the fall of Saigon.

FAF

The first FAFs were built in 1977, at the Citroën plant in Mangualde, Portugal.

Other
In Argentina: Savoiacars , has prepared some cars based on the Méhari, with improved platform and engine, and another with a body of their own design.

Various kit car style bodies were also developed, inspired by the Méhari, such as Belgium's VanClee.

References

Defunct motor vehicle manufacturers